Karp was an American post-hardcore band from Tumwater, Washington, that formed in 1990 and lasted until 1998. The band was formed by Chris Smith a.k.a. Chris "Slayer", Jared Warren and Scott Jernigan. They released three full-length albums titled Mustaches Wild, Suplex, and Self Titled LP. They also released several EPs and 7-inch records.

Karp mixed elements of hardcore punk and metal à la the Melvins with an ear for pop-influenced song assembly. The band name is inspired from a newsletter/zine that Smith put out in high school and is an acronym that stands for "Kill All Redneck Pricks". Their oft used logo of an eagle with spread wings was a modification on the defunct National Recovery Administration's "Blue Eagle" logo. Their recordings were released by several Northwest-related labels such as K Records, Kill Rock Stars, and Punk in My Vitamins.

Members went on to play with Tight Bro's from Way Back When, The Whip, Dead Air Fresheners, Big Business and the Melvins. Drummer Scott Jernigan died in a boating accident on June 10, 2003.

New York-based documentarian Bill Badgley (of the rock band Federation X), released a documentary on the band, entitled Kill All Redneck Pricks, a preview of which was shown in Seattle October 22, 2009.

Discography

Albums
 Mustaches Wild 10-inch/LP/CD, K Records (1994)
 Suplex CD/LP, K Records (1995)
 Self Titled LP CD/LP, K Records (1997)
 Action Chemistry CD (singles compilation), Punk in My Vitamins (2001)

7" singles and EPs
 I'd Rather Be Clogging 7-inch Punk in My Vitamins
 I'm Done 7-inch Punk in My Vitamins
 Freighty Cat EP 7-inch Atlas
 We Ate Sand 7-inch, K Records (1996)
 Prison Shake 7-inch, Up Records

Compilation appearances and splits
 Karp / Rye Coalition split CD/12", Troubleman Unlimited
 Bostonot compilation: "Let Me Take You Home Tonight" - Face the Music Records FTM-4
 Jabberjaw: Good to the Last Drop 7-inch Mammoth
 Karp/Long Hind Legs split 7-inch, Karate Brand
 Stars Kill Rock CD/LP, Kill Rock Stars
 Julep compilation CD/LP, Yoyo Recordings, 1993

References

External links
band's bio on I Heart Noise
KRS - Karp Factsheet

American post-hardcore musical groups
Musical groups from Olympia, Washington
K Records artists
Musical groups established in 1990